Kuciny  (1943–1945 German Kutzingen) is a village in the administrative district of Gmina Dalików, within Poddębice County, Łódź Voivodeship, in central Poland.

References

Kuciny